Zeynifelek Hanım (1824 - 20 December 1842; meaning "Ornament from heaven") was a consort of Sultan Abdulmejid I of the Ottoman Empire.

Zeynifelek was Abkhaz, and belonged to the princely Klıç family. She was educated at court with her sister and cousins ​​and Bezmiâlem Sultan, Abdülmejid's mother, introduce her to the sultan. Known for her beauty and skill as a painter, Abdülmejid asked her for a portrait of his and then fell in love with her.

Zeynifelek married Abdulmejid in 1840. She was given the title of "Second Ikbal". On 22 February 1841, she gave birth to her only child, a daughter, Behiye Sultan (called also Behi Sultan) in the Old Beşiktaş Palace. The princess died at the age of six in 1847.

Zeynifelek Hanım died of tuberculosis on 20 December 1842, and was buried in the mausoleum of Nakşidil Sultan, Fatih Mosque, Istanbul. Charles White, who visited Istanbul in 1843, said following about her:

Issue

In literature
Zeynifelek is a character in Hıfzı Topuz's historical novel Abdülmecit: İmparatorluk Çökerken Sarayda 22 Yıl: Roman (2009).

See also
Ikbal (title)
Ottoman Imperial Harem
List of consorts of the Ottoman sultans

Annotations

References

Sources

1842 deaths
19th-century people from the Ottoman Empire
Ottoman Sunni Muslims
Consorts of Abdulmejid I